This is a list in alphabetical order of cricketers who have played for Kandy Customs Sports Club in first-class matches. Where there is an article, the link comes before the club career span, and the scorecard name (typically initials and surname) comes after. If no article is present, the scorecard name comes before the span.

A	
 K. M. K. N. Akash (2022 to 2022–23)
 D. Amarasiri (2018–19)
 M. C. D. Aponsu (2019–20)
 W. S. A. Appuhami (2021–22 to 2022–23)

B	
 N. M. S. K. Bandara (2022)
 Rishi Bhardwaj (2020–21) : R. Bhardwaj
 S. Boteju (2022–23)

C	
 Umega Chaturanga (2019–20 to 2022–23) : J. U. Chaturanga
 S. D. Chitnis (2022–23)

D	
 K. D. V. Deepal (2022)
 L. H. S. P. de Silva (2020–21 to 2022)
 Ian Dev Singh (2019–20 to 2022–23) : I. Dev Singh
 Gihan de Zoysa (2018–19) : G. de Zoysa
 Dilan Suraweera (2018–19) : S. A. D. Dilpriya
 Sumedha Dissanayake (2018–19) : S. M. Dissanayake

E	
 P. M. Ekanayake (2022)
 S. D. Elwalage (2022)

F	
 Deshan Fernando (2019–20) : H. S. D. Fernando
 W. A. R. Fernando (2019–20)
 W. N. S. Fernando (2022)
 W. T. D. Fernando (2018–19)
 M. A. R. K. Fonseka (2022–23)

G	
 Kaushalya Gajasinghe (2019–20) : K. P. Gajasinghe
 Tharindu Gamage (2020–21) : T. R. Gamage
 C. Gunasinghe (2021–22)
 Tharaka Gunawardena (2019–20) : Y. T. Gunawardena

H	
 D. A. Harshana (2022 to 2022–23)
 H. S. Hewanayake (2018–19)
 Shehan Hirudika (2018–19) : H. M. S. Hirudika

I	
 Ushan Imantha (2019–20) : K. U. Imantha
 A. A. Inham (2019–20 to 2022)

J	
 M. M. Jaleel (2021–22)
 H. Jayasekera (2022–23)
 K. A. S. Jayasinghe (2018–19)
 M. A. W. Jayasooriya (2022)
 M. S. S. Jayawickrama (2022 to 2022–23)

K	
 C. J. P. F. Kalugamage (2018–19)
 A. Karunanayake (2018–19)
 M. L. R. Karunaratne (2021–22 to 2022–23)
 C. G. Khurana (2019–20)
 K. V. Kottawasinhage (2022)
 N. P. M. T. Kumara (2019–20 to 2022–23)

L	
 H. K. Lakshan (2022 to 2022–23)
 N. L. S. D. N. Lokubandara (2020–21)

M	
 M. H. Madushan (2019–20)
 Imesh Madushanka (2019–20 to 2020–21) : G. I. Madushanka
 H. R. R. Madushanka (2021–22 to 2022–23)
 T. Malshan (2019–20 to 2022)
 K. Manamperi (2018–19)
 S. R. Manuranga (2019–20 to 2022)
 N. N. B. Mendis (2018–19)
 Mohammad Waqas (2018–19)

N	
 Lasindu Nimsara (2019–20) : U. G. L. Nimsara
 S. S. A. H. Nirmal (2020–21 to 2021–22)

P	
 T. P. S. M. Pathirana (2022 to 2022–23)
 E. M. N. C. Peiris (2018–19)
 Sampath Perera (2019–20 to 2022–23) : D. R. S. Perera
 K. L. J. Perera (2018–19)
 S. S. M. Perera (2019–20 to 2022–23)
 P. R. Pethangoda (2022)
 A. A. Prakash (2020–21 to 2022–23)
 Buddika Prasad (2018–19 to 2019–20) : T. G. B. Prasad

R	
 P. Rajamunindra (2019–20)
 H. M. Rajapaksha (2022–23)
 N. S. Ranga (2022 to 2022–23)
 Nimnaka Ratnayake (2018–19 to 2019–20) : N. S. Ratnayake
 Vittorio Roberto (2018–19) : V. Roberto
 A. K. T. Ruckshan (2021–22 to 2022)

S	
 I. S. S. Samarasooriya (2022–23)
 A. W. S. Sankalpa (2018–19)
 P. B. Senaratne (2018–19)
 P. Sharma (2022–23)
 N. T. H. R. K. Shehara (2018–19)
 K. Silva (2019–20)

T	
 Tharaka Waduge (2018–19) : W. W. P. Taraka
 K. D. R. Thiwanka (2018–19)

U	
 R. J. I. Udayanga (2022–23)
 Vimukthi Umagiliyage (2018–19) : D. V. G. Umagiliyage
 M. I Umar (2019–20)

V	
 L. Vilochana (2020–21 to 2022)

W	
 Neranjana Wanniarachchi (2019–20) : W. N. K. Wanniarachchi
 K. P. S. A. M. Weerasinghe (2020–21)
 T. A. N. Weerasinghe (2019–20)
 R. S. Wickramarachchi (2019–20 to 2020–21)
 Sandaru Chanditha (2019–20) : S. C. Wickramaratne
 W. A. C. P. Wijelath (2022)
 K. L. V. D. Wijeratne (2020–21 to 2022–23)
 Chanaka Wijesinghe (2019–20 to 2022–23) : C. G. Wijesinghe
 Ravishka Wijesiri (2018–19) : R. M. Wijesiri
 Isitha Wijesundera (2020–21) : I. D. Wijesundera

References	
	
	
	
	
	
Kandy Customs Sports Club